The Baby Borrowers is a British reality television series produced by Love Productions for BBC Three. The series premiered 8 January 2007. The show features five couples aged between 16 and 19. They start off attempting to look after a baby for three days, before moving onto toddlers, pre-teens, teenagers and finally an elderly person.

There were also two spin off shows; The Baby Borrowers: Compilation showing highlight moments from the previous week, and The Baby Borrowers: Friends and Family asking what the teenage couples dearest and nearest think.

Criticism

Before being broadcast, the program received bad publicity as it was seen to be immoral to allow inexperienced teenagers to look after real babies. However, the BBC assured viewers that the parents of the babies had given consent, and that a nanny was on hand at all times to intervene if need be.

In actuality, when the show aired in the UK, few parents intervened even when their babies were extremely upset, and the nannies gave controversial advice, including letting babies "cry it out". One older baby was refused a clean nappy because he had been potty-trained before the show started.

Episodes

Series 1

References

External links
 

2007 British television series debuts
2007 British television series endings
2000s British reality television series
BBC Television shows
English-language television shows
Parenting television series